John Croker is the name of:

John Croker (engraver) (1670–1741), earlier Johann Crocker, German-born engraver who worked mostly in Great Britain
John Croker (politician) (1680–1751), Irish politician
John Wilson Croker (1780–1857), Irish politician and author

See also
 John Coker (disambiguation)
 John Crocker (disambiguation)
 John Croke (disambiguation)